The 2019 Melbourne Cup (known commercially as 2019 Lexus Melbourne Cup) was the 159th running of the Melbourne Cup, a prestigious Australian Thoroughbred horse race.

The race was overshadowed by recent news of the ill-treatment of horses in the Australian racing industry, and by the pulling out of notable celebrities including pop-star Taylor Swift, model Megan Gale, and X-Men actress Lana Condor.

The final field for the race was declared on 2 November. The total prize money for the race was A$8 million, an increase of the previous year.

The race was won by Vow And Declare, ridden by Craig Williams and trained by Danny O'Brien.

Field

Broadcast

In 2018, Network 10 bought the rights to air the Melbourne Cup from 2019 to 2023 for $100 million, outbidding former broadcaster Seven Network.

Notes

References

Melbourne Cup
Melbourne Cup
Melbourne Cup
2010s in Melbourne